Generally,  British countries can mean:

Countries of the United Kingdom
Countries of the British Empire